The Fifth Amendment to the Constitution of Pakistan (Urdu: آئین پاکستان میں پانچویں ترمیم) was adopted on September 5, 1976, by the elected Parliament of Pakistan under the democratic government of Zulfikar Ali Bhutto.

The V Amendment widened the scope of restrictions in the Constitution of Pakistan on the Pakistan High Courts to strip powers of the High Courts to enforce the grants of natural fundamental rights explained in Chapter I, Part II of the Constitution. This amendment also imposed the import and sales tax on the consumer product.  V Amendment also restricted the eligibility of the Governor or the Chief minister of those who are not from the provinces in which they have contested elections for their respective offices.  V Amendment also set the maximum age of the Chief Justice as well as the term of serving the respected office.

Text of amendment

References

External links
V Amendment

05
Government of Zulfikar Ali Bhutto